Houghton Bay and Valley is one of the southern suburbs of Wellington, New Zealand. It is located between Island Bay and Lyall Bay, on the rocky shores of the Cook Strait. It has two beaches, Houghton Bay and Princess Bay, used by surfers, swimmers and divers.

History

Houghton Bay was named after Captain Robert Houghton, who was the person responsible for the powder magazine on Matiu / Somes Island, and later the signal station at Mount Albert above Houghton Bay.

In the 19th century The Hermit of Island Bay lived in a nearby cave.

Features

Houghton Bay and Valley is predominantly a residential area, but also contains the southern part of Wellington's Southern Walkway, the Buckley Road reserve, Houghton Valley Playcentre, Houghton Valley School and the Southern Headlands Reserve.

Along with other parts of Wellington's South Coast it is a popular recreational diving spot, within the Taputeranga Marine Reserve. In 2005 the decommissioned frigate HMNZS Wellington was sunk off Houghton Bay, and is now an artificial reef and dive location. Houghton Bay is also a surfing spot, like nearby Lyall Bay.

Houghton Valley and Bay are home to musicians and artists, and to the Haewai Meadery and Wind Gardens.

On the hill overlooking the breakers is the Wellington dance and dining venue, The Pines.

The Aurora Australis can be seen, as the light pollution is shielded to some degree by the range of hills along the coastline. A dark sky is necessary as most aurorae are weak and barely visible to the naked eye at this latitude.

Demographics 

Houghton Bay had a population of 1,677 at the 2018 New Zealand census, an increase of 126 people (8.1%) since the 2013 census, and an increase of 189 people (12.7%) since the 2006 census. There were 648 households. There were 810 males and 870 females, giving a sex ratio of 0.93 males per female. The median age was 36.4 years (compared with 37.4 years nationally), with 336 people (20.0%) aged under 15 years, 324 (19.3%) aged 15 to 29, 867 (51.7%) aged 30 to 64, and 153 (9.1%) aged 65 or older.

Ethnicities were 88.2% European/Pākehā, 8.4% Māori, 4.5% Pacific peoples, 6.6% Asian, and 3.8% other ethnicities (totals add to more than 100% since people could identify with multiple ethnicities).

The proportion of people born overseas was 30.4%, compared with 27.1% nationally.

Although some people objected to giving their religion, 64.4% had no religion, 23.8% were Christian, 1.3% were Hindu, 0.7% were Muslim, 0.9% were Buddhist and 3.4% had other religions.

Of those at least 15 years old, 618 (46.1%) people had a bachelor or higher degree, and 96 (7.2%) people had no formal qualifications. The median income was $46,600, compared with $31,800 nationally. The employment status of those at least 15 was that 822 (61.3%) people were employed full-time, 198 (14.8%) were part-time, and 60 (4.5%) were unemployed.

Education

The school was founded in 1930.

See also

 Aurora Australis
 Te Raekaihau Point
 Lyall Bay
 Wellington
 Light pollution

References

External links

Suburbs of Wellington City
Bays of the Wellington Region
Cook Strait
Beaches of the Wellington Region